Hypotrachyna angustissima is a species of foliose lichen in the family Parmeliaceae. This species is characterised by the occurrence of usnic acid in its cortex, and salazinic acid in its medulla and laminal isidia. In this it resembles Hypotrachyna microblasta, but the latter has wider laciniae and larger apothecia, and is laterally overlapping. Its epithet angustissima is derived from the Latin angusti, meaning "narrow", due to this species' very narrow laciniae.

Description
Its surface is continuous and somewhat irregularly cracked, being isodichotomously ramified. The species' axilla is oval, it counts with truncate apices, and a black-lined margin. It shows no lacinules nor soredia while showing weakly laminal maculae.

Its isidia are cylindrical with an irregular diameter, being between 0.2 and 0.8 mm high. Its medulla is white, while its underside is black, possessing a shiny and rugose, lighter margin. Its central surface is veined and papillate. It counts with 8 spores per ascus, which are ellipsoid. Pycnidia are absent in Hypotrachyna angustissima.

Habitat
This species was first found in the Ibitipoca State Park, in Minas Gerais, on a rocky wall.

References

Further reading
Holz, Ingo, and Robbert S. Gradstein. "Cryptogamic epiphytes in primary and recovering upper montane oak forests of Costa Rica–species richness, community composition and ecology." Plant Ecology 178.1 (2005): 89-109.

angustissima
Lichen species
Lichens described in 2002
Lichens of Brazil
Taxa named by Klaus Kalb